De Nieuwe Avonturen van Dik Trom  is a 1958 Dutch film directed by Henk van der Linden. The film was based on the popular children's book series Dik Trom by Cornelis Johannes Kieviet.

There were several Dik Trom movies, the most recent is the 2010 movie Dik Trom.

Cast
 Sjefke Nievelstein as Dik Trom
 Rinus Bonekamp as patrolman Flipse
 Minnie Mennens as Blind Nelly
 Michel Odekerken as Dik Trom's father
 Mia Maessen as Dik Trom's mother
 Thea Eyssen as Blind Nelly's mother

External links 
 

1958 films
Dutch black-and-white films
Dutch children's films
Dutch comedy films
Films based on Dutch novels
1950s Dutch-language films